is a railway station on the Kyūdai Main Line operated by JR Kyushu in Kusu, Ōita Prefecture, Japan.

Lines

Layout 
The station consists of a side and an island platform serving three tracks at grade. The station building is timber structure, remodelled in 2013, built in traditional Japanese style with tiled roofs and steeply angled eaves. It houses a waiting area and a staffed ticket window. Access to the island platform is by means of a footbridge. To the south of the station are multiple passing loops and sidings.

Management of the station has been outsourced to the JR Kyushu Tetsudou Eigyou Co., a wholly owned subsidiary of JR Kyushu specialising in station services. It staffs the ticket counter which is equipped with a POS machine but does not have a Midori no Madoguchi facility.

Adjacent stations

History
The Daito Railway was nationalized on 1 December 1922, after which Japanese Government Railways (JGR) undertook phased westward expansion of the track which, at the time, it had designated as the Daito Line. By 1928, the track had reached . Subsequently, the track was extended further west and Bungo-Mori was opened as the new western terminus on 15 December 1929. On 15 November 1934, when the Daito Line had linked up with the Kyudai Main Line further west, JGR designated the station as part of the Kyudai Main Line. With the privatization of Japanese National Railways (JNR), the successor of JGR, on 1 April 1987, the station came under the control of JR Kyushu.

In 2013, the station building was renovated in preparation for the arrival of the luxury train Seven Stars in Kyushu. The station building, station furniture, roof and footbridge were all remodeled in a deep brown colour to reflect an "earth and forest" theme in deference to the location of the station. In 2014, the renovation works won an award from the Japan Association of Railway Architects.

Passenger statistics
In fiscal 2016, the station was used by an average of 338 passengers daily (boarding passengers only), and it ranked 292nd among the busiest stations of JR Kyushu.

See also
List of railway stations in Japan

References

External links
Bungo-Mori (JR Kyushu)

Railway stations in Ōita Prefecture
Stations of Kyushu Railway Company
Railway stations in Japan opened in 1929